Gaius Julius Alexion (after 56 - 78) was a Syrian Prince and Roman Client Priest King of Emesa. He was the son of Syrian king Sohaemus and Queen Consort Drusilla.

Family
Alexion was born to the monarchs Sohaemus of Emesa and Drusilla. The father of Alexion, Sohaemus was an Emesene Prince and ruled as Priest King from 54 until his death in 73. He was the second son of the previous ruling Emesene Monarchs Sampsiceramus II and his wife Iotapa. Alexion's late paternal uncle was the childless Emesene King Gaius Julius Azizus who was the first husband of the Herodian Princess Drusilla, while he had two paternal aunts, Iotapa who married the Herodian Prince Aristobulus Minor and Mamaea.

Alexion's mother was a princess from Mauretania, North Africa. Drusilla was the child of the late Roman Client Monarchs Ptolemy of Mauretania and Julia Urania. The mother of Drusilla may have been a member of the Royal family of Emesa and her father was a maternal grandson of the Ptolemaic Greek Queen Cleopatra VII of Egypt and Roman Triumvir Mark Antony.

The name Alexion is a variant of the ancient Greek name Alexander. The name Alexander was a dynastic name in the Emesani Royal Family; the Seleucid dynasty; the Ptolemaic dynasty and perhaps Alexion's parents named him an intent to recover their heritage and connections to Alexander the Great. Alexion was a descendant of the Seleucid dynasty; the Ptolemaic dynasty and a distant relative of Alexander the Great through his paternal grandmother and maternal grandfather.

Life
Alexion was born and raised in Emesa. After his father died, Alexion succeeded his father as Priest King of Emesa. Alexion ruled as a Priest King from 73 until his death in 78, thus he was a contemporary of the ruling Roman emperor Vespasian. He was the priest of the Emesene Sun God Elagabalus. Little is known on him. What is known about Alexion is from surviving inscriptions from Emesa.

There was a noted sepulchral Greek inscription on the mausoleum of Emesa dated 78/79 at Emesa, dedicated by Gaius Julius Sampsigeramus Seilas, who may have been related to the Sampsigeramid dynasty:

Gaius Julius, Fabia, Sampsigeramus, also called Seilas, son of Gaius Julius Alexion, while still living made this for himself and his family, year 390

After the death of Alexion, the generations after him are not recorded sufficiently to accurately present a pedigree. A descendant of Alexion's is the Emesene high priest Gaius Julius Bassianus, who was the father of the Roman Empress Julia Domna and another possible descendant was the Palmyrene Queen of the 3rd century Zenobia.

References

Sources
 Kingdom of Commagene
 Royal Egyptian Genealogy: Ptolemaic Descendants
 Ptolemaic Genealogy - Cleopatra Selene
 Ptolemaic Genealogy - Alexander Helios
 Alexion meaning and name origin
 
 
 
 H. Temporini & W. Haase, Aufstieg und Niedergang der römischen Welt: Geschichte und Kultur Roms im spiegel der neueren Forschung, Walter de Gruyter, 1977
 D.W. Roller, The Building Program of Herod the Great, University of California Press, 1998
 A.R. Birley, Septimius Severus: the African emperor, Routledge, 1999
 J.P. Brown, Israel and Hellas, Volume 3, Walter de Gruyter, 2001
 M. Chahin, The Kingdom of Armenia, Routledge, 2001
 B. Levick, Julia Domna, Syrian Empress, Taylor & Francis, 2007

People from Homs
People of Roman Syria
Emesene dynasty
Roman client rulers
Ptolemaic dynasty
1st-century monarchs in the Middle East
1st-century Romans
1st-century Arabs
Middle Eastern kings
Alexion, Gaius